Baron Jurij Bartolomej Vega (also Veha; ; ; born Vehovec, March 23, 1754 – September 26, 1802) was a Slovene mathematician, physicist and artillery officer.

Early life

Born to a farmer's family in the small village of Zagorica east of Ljubljana in Slovenia, Vega was 6 years old when his father Jernej Veha died. Vega was educated first in Moravče and later attended high school for six years (1767–1773) in Ljubljana (the Jesuit College of Ljubljana), studying Latin, Greek, religion, German, history, geography, science, and mathematics. At that time there were about 500 students there. He was a schoolfellow of Anton Tomaž Linhart, a Slovenian writer and historian. Vega finished high school when he was 19, in 1773. After completing his studies at the Lyceum of Ljubljana (Licej v Ljubljani) he became a navigational engineer in 1775. Tentamen philosophicum, a list of questions for his comprehensive examination, was preserved and is available in the Mathematical Library in Ljubljana. The problems cover logic, algebra, metaphysics, geometry, trigonometry, geodesy, stereometry, geometry of curves, ballistics, and general and special physics.

Military service
Vega left Ljubljana five years after graduation and entered military service in 1780 as a professor of mathematics at the Artillery School in Vienna. At that time he started to sign his last name as Vega and no longer Veha. When Vega was 33 he married Josefa Svoboda (Jožefa Swoboda) (1771–1800), a Czech noble from České Budějovice who was 16 at that time.

Vega participated in several wars. In 1788 he served under Austrian Imperial Field-Marshal Ernst Gideon von Laudon (1717–1790) in a campaign against the Turks at Belgrade. His command of several mortar batteries contributed considerably to the fall of the Belgrade fortress. Between 1793 and 1797 he fought French Revolutionaries under the command of Austrian General Dagobert-Sigismond de Wurmser (1724–1797) with the European coalition on the Austrian side. He fought at Fort Louis, Mannheim, Mainz, Wiesbaden, Kehl, and Dietz. In 1795 he had two 30-pound (14 kilogram) mortars cast, with conically drilled bases and a greater charge, for a firing range up to 3000 metres (3300 yards). The old 60 lb (27 kg) mortars had a range of only 1800 m (2000 yd).

In September 1802 Vega was reported missing. After a few days' search his body was found. The police report concluded that his death was an accident. It is believed that he died on 26 September 1802 in Nußdorf on the Danube, near the Austrian capital, Vienna.

Mathematical accomplishments

Vega published a series of books of logarithm tables. The first one appeared in 1783. Much later, in 1797 it was followed by a second volume that contained a collection of integrals and other useful formulae. His Handbook, which was originally published in 1793, was later translated into several languages and appeared in over 100 issues. His major work was Thesaurus Logarithmorum Completus (Treasury of all Logarithms) that was first published 1794 in Leipzig (its 90th edition was published in 1924). This mathematical table was actually based on Adriaan Vlacq's tables, but corrected a number of errors and extended the logarithms of trigonometric functions for the small angles. An engineer, Franc Allmer, honourable senator of the Graz University of Technology, has found Vega's logarithmic tables with 10 decimal places in the Museum of Carl Friedrich Gauss in Göttingen. Gauss used this work frequently and he has written in it several calculations. Gauss has also found some of Vega's errors in the calculations in the range of numbers, of which there are more than a million. A copy of Vega's Thesaurus belonging to the private collection of the British mathematician and computing pioneer Charles Babbage (1791–1871) is preserved at the Royal Observatory, Edinburgh.

Over the years Vega wrote a four volume textbook Vorlesungen über die Mathematik(Lectures about Mathematics). Volume I appeared in 1782 when he was 28 years old, Volume II in 1784, Volume III in 1788 and Volume IV in 1800. His textbooks also contain interesting tables: for instance, in Volume II one can find closed form expressions for sines of multiples of 3 degrees, written in a form easy to work with.

Vega wrote at least six scientific papers. On August 20, 1789 Vega achieved a world record when he calculated pi to 140 places, of which the first 126 were correct. This calculation he proposed to the Russian Academy of Sciences in Saint Petersburg in the booklet V. razprava (The fifth discussion), where he had found with his calculating method an error on the 113th place from the estimation of Thomas Fantet de Lagny (1660–1734) from 1719 of 127 places. Vega retained his record 52 years until 1841 and his method is mentioned still today. His article was not published by the Academy until six years later, in 1795. Vega had improved John Machin's formula from 1706:

with his formula, which is equal to Euler's formula from 1755:

and which converges faster than Machin's formula. He had checked his result with the similar Hutton's formula:

He had developed the second term in the series only once.

Although he worked in the subjects of ballistics, physics and astronomy, his major contributions are to the mathematics of the second half of the 18th century.

In 1781 Vega tried to push further his idea in the Austrian Habsburg monarchy about the usage of the decimal metric system of units. His idea was not accepted, but it was introduced later under the emperor Franz Josef I in 1871.

Vega was a member of the Academy of Practical Sciences in Mainz, the Physical and Mathematical Society of Erfurt, the Bohemian Scientific Society in Prague, and the Prussian Academy of Sciences in Berlin. He was also an associate member of the British Scientific Society in Göttingen. He was awarded the Order of Maria Theresa on May 11, 1796. In 1800 Vega obtained a title of hereditary baron including the right to his own coat of arms.

Legacy
Jurij Vega High School (Gimnazija Jurija Vege) in Idrija was founded in 1901 as the first Slovene Realschule. In 1935, Vega (crater) on the Moon was named after Vega. The National Bank of Slovenia issued a 50 tolar banknote in his honour in 1993, and the Slovene Post Office issued a stamp honouring Vega in 1994. The asteroid 14966 Jurijvega, discovered on July 30, 1997, is named after him. Slovenia's Vega Astronomical Society is named after both Jurij Vega and the star Vega. The star, however, is not named after Jurij Vega and its name is much older. A free open-source physics library for 3D deformable object simulation, Vega FEM, has also been named after Vega.

Scientific genealogy

References

External links 

 Jurij Vega on the Slovenian 50 Tolars banknote.
 Georg Freiherr von Vega at MacTutor History of Mathematics archive
 Vega and his time
 Vega FEM library

1754 births
1802 deaths
18th-century Carniolan people
18th-century mathematicians
18th-century physicists
18th-century astronomers
Carniolan mathematicians
Carniolan physicists
Carniolan astronomers
Ballistics experts
Pi-related people
Barons of Austria
Slovene nobility
Carniolan nobility
People from the Municipality of Dol pri Ljubljani